Gaya Station may refer to

 Gaya station (Korail), Korea
 Gaya station (Busan Metro), Korea
 Gaya Junction railway station, India